Antaeotricha isotona is a species of moth in the family Depressariidae. It was described by Edward Meyrick in 1932. It is found in Panama.

References

Moths described in 1932
isotona
Taxa named by Edward Meyrick
Moths of Central America